The Best of Take That is a repackaged version of British boy band Take That's first Greatest Hits compilation, which was released in 1996. The album was released via Calipso Entertainment, and became the first semi-new release since the band split up. The album has an identical track listing to their Greatest Hits album. The album was released on 16 June 2001, exclusively in Brazil and other areas of South America.

Track listing

Personnel
Gary Barlow – vocals, songwriter
Robbie Williams – vocals
Jason Orange – vocals
Mark Owen – vocals
Howard Donald – vocals

References

Take That albums
2001 greatest hits albums